Lin Yuan-lang (born 28 December 1940) is a Taiwanese politician. He served as the Magistrate of Nantou County from 1989 to 1997.

References

Magistrates of Nantou County
Taiwanese people of Hoklo descent
Living people
1940 births